Bounces is a 1985 sports/fighting game released for the Commodore 64 and ZX Spectrum.

Points are scored by catching and throwing the bouncing ball into a goal, or by knocking the opponent out with the ball or hand-to-hand combat. Each contestant is hampered by being attached to the wall by a length of elastic.

References

External links

1985 video games
Commodore 64 games
Fighting games
Video games developed in the United Kingdom
Video games scored by Fred Gray
ZX Spectrum games
Multiplayer and single-player video games
Denton Designs games